Seondo-dong is an administrative dong or neighbourhood in the administrative subdivisions of the Gyeongju City, North Gyeongsang province, South Korea. It consists of four legal dongs such as Seoak-dong, Chunghyo-dong, Hyohyeon-dong, and Gwangmyeong-dong. It is bordered by Seonggeon-dong and Tapjeong-dong on the east, Geoncheon-eup on the south and west and Hyeongok-myeon on the north. Its 28.00 square kilometers are home to about  13,587 people. This population is served by an elementary school, a middle school and a joint middle-high school, two high schools, a junior college, a university and a vocational school.

See also
Subdivisions of Gyeongju
Administrative divisions of South Korea

References

External links
 The official site of the Seondo-dong office

Subdivisions of Gyeongju
Neighbourhoods in South Korea